Dee Jay Daniels (born Dorjan Lyndell Daniels; October 17, 1988) is an American former television actor.

Daniels is best known for his role as Michael Hughley on the D. L. Hughley sitcom, The Hughleys, playing the son of Hughley's character. He also appeared in several shows including In the House, Coach, The Wayans Bros., Grace Under Fire and Cold Case. He also had a supporting role as Ethan in the 2005 Disney film, Sky High.

Legal issues
Daniels was arrested for murder in Stockton, California in 2011 in the alleged stabbing death of J.J Lewis.  He was acquitted on December 21, 2012.

References

External links

1988 births
Living people
21st-century American criminals
Male actors from California
African-American male actors
American male child actors
American male film actors
American male television actors
People acquitted of murder
People from Montclair, California
21st-century African-American people
20th-century African-American people